The Meinert Ranch Cabin is located 1.8 miles southwest of Red River Hot Springs on Red River-Beargrass Road 234, near Elk City in Idaho County, Idaho.  It was built in 1915.  It was listed on the National Register of Historic Places in 1987.

It is a one-and-a-half-story log cabin with a gambrel roof.

References

Houses on the National Register of Historic Places in Idaho
Houses completed in 1915
Idaho County, Idaho
Log cabins